Gerd Schenker (born 2 June 1948) is a German percussionist.

Life 
From 1965 to 1969 he studied percussion with Otto Reil at the Hochschule für Musik "Hanns Eisler" in Berlin. From 1968 to 1972 he worked as a percussionist at the Volksbühne.

Since 1972 he has been activ with the Leipzig Radio Symphony Orchestra (today MDR-Sinfonieorchester). In 1975 he became solo-percussionist. From 1974 to 1993 he was also a member of the Gruppe Neue Musik Hanns Eisler. With the ensemble he received the Art Prize of the German Democratic Republic (1980), the Kunstpreis der Stadt Leipzig (1986) and the Schneider-Schott Music Prize in Main (1991).

Schenker has performed compositions by Paul-Heinz Dittrich, Reiner Bredemeyer, Ruth Zechlin, Bernt Franke, Karl Ottomar Treibmann, Friedrich Schenker, (Gerd Schenker's brother) and Krzysztof Meyer among others. He is a member of the Forum Zeitgenössischer Musik Leipzig. Schenker is active as editor of percussion literature.

Literature 
 Zeitgenössische Musik für Schlagzeug : 1 Spieler. VEB Deutscher Verlag für Musik, 1988.
 Burkhard Glaetzner, Reiner Kontressowitz (ed.): Gruppe Neue Musik  "Hanns Eisler" 1970–1990. Spiel-Horizonte. Leipzig 1990, .

References

External links 
 
 Short biography on Webarchiv

German percussionists
1948 births
Living people
People from Zeulenroda-Triebes